Mukkall village is located in Kalghatgi Tehsil of Dharwad district in Karnataka, India. You may refer it on web by clicking on  Mukkall (Google Maps)
It is situated at a distance of 10 km from sub-district headquarter Kalghatgi and 43 km away from district headquarter Dharwad and 428 km from State capital Bangalore. Mukkal is the gram panchayat of Mukkall village. The post office related to Mukkall is Kalghatgi. Polity wise it comes under Kalghatgi assembly constituency and as per Lok Sabha it comes ambit of Dharwad constituency.

Mukkall Pincode is 581204 and postal head office is Kalghatagi.
The total geographical area of village is 1220.51 hectares with a total population of 2,674 peoples and the village has 579 houses in Mukkall village. Kalghatgi is nearest town to Mukkall which is approximately 10 km away. Mukkall vehicle registration code is KA 25. Regional Transport Office (RTO) located in Dharwad. Nearest blood banks available for the village is at The Rotary Blood Bank, Hospital, Kelgeri Road, Kelgeri Road, Dharwad, Karnataka 580008

Nearby villages of Mukkall are enlisted below along with approximate distances between them:
 Beeravalli (5 km)
 Tavargeri (5 km)
 Bammigatti (7 km)
 Madakihonnahalli (9 km)
 Kalghatgi (10 km)

Demographics 
As of the 2011 Census of India there were 579 households in Mukkall  and a total population of 2,674 consisting of 1,383 males and 1,291 females. There were 300 children ages 0-6.

Other details of Mukkall

Schools in Mukkall 

HPS Mukkal and Sri Amedkar High School. Here there are two schools Government higher primary school from 1st standard to 7th class and there is an AIDED school Sri Amedkar High school from 8th standard to 10th class. Both school have decent teaching staff. Both schools are quite famous in surrounding villages and children from surrounding villages like Somanakoppa, Somakoppa, Hunasikatti, Tavargere, Bammigatti, Belavantara and Deverakonda join these schools for education purpose.

There is a hostel facility available for backward classes girls who are studying in primary school.

Important Festivals in Mukkall 

Important festivals celebrated in Mukkall are Yugadi, Dussehra, Makara Snakranthi, Karaga, Hampi Festival, Hoysala Mahotsava, Vairamudi, Tula Sankramana, Diwali, Eid-ul-Adha, Muharrum, Eid-ul-Fitr are the major festivals celebrated in Mukkall. There are two famous goddess in this village. They are Dyamavva and Durgavva. After 30 years long time new temple have been built for these goddess

Tourist places near Mukkall 

People can visit following tourist places such as Chandramouleshwara Temple, Banashankari Temple, Nrupatunga Hill, Navagraha Teertha, The Indira Gandhi Glass House Garden, Unkal lake, Siddhoroodha Math, are the major tourist attractions near to Mukkall.

Agriculture information 

In farming Rice, Ragi, Jowar, Maize, Pulses, Oilseeds, Cashews, coconut, arecanut, cardamom, chillies, cotton, sugarcane and tobacco are the major crops that are cultivated mostly in the area.

Mukkall cuisine 

If someone would like to try the local cuisine at Mukkall, one can try any of the following Ajethna, Akki rotti, Basundi, Benne dose, Bisi Bele Bath, Bombay rava, Bonda, Byadagi chilli, Chapati, Chiroti, Chitranna, Churmuri, Dalithoy, Dharwad pedha, Dosa, Enne gai, Jhunka, Jolada rotti, Karadantu, Kori rotti, Kosambari, Maddur vada, Mangalore bajji, Mangalorean Bangude Masala, Mitra Samaja, Mysore pak, Narsobawadi Basundi, Neer dosa, Oondees, Papadum, Ragi mudde, Ragi rotti, Rasam, Rava dosa, Rava idli, Surnoli, Thumbuli, Upma, Upsaaru, Uttapam, Vada are few of the many varieties of Mukkall.

How to reach Mukkall

By Road 

Kalghatgi is the Nearest Town to Mukkall. Kalghatgi is 11 km from Mukkall. Road connectivity is there from Kalghatgi to Mukkall.

By Rail 

There is no railway station near to Mukkall in less than 10 km. How ever	Hubli Jn Rail Way Station is major railway station 32 km near to Mukkall

Politics in Mukkall 

Representatives from Bhartiya Janta Party (BJP) and Indian National Congress (INC) are present in the village.

Polling Stations /Booths near Mukkall 

 Govt Higher Primary School Room No. 1
 Govt Lower Primary School

References

Villages in Dharwad district